Alfonso del Galdo (born 1550 in Medina del Campo) was a Spanish clergyman and bishop for the Roman Catholic Archdiocese of Tegucigalpa. He was ordained in 1612. He was appointed bishop in 1613. He died in 1629.

References 

1550 births
1629 deaths
Spanish Roman Catholic bishops
People from Medina del Campo
Roman Catholic bishops of Comayagua